Brigadoon is a suburb of Perth, Western Australia. It is in the City of Swan local government area.

It sits on the edge of the Darling Scarp adjacent to the entrance to the Avon Valley, through which the Avon River flows. The Bells Rapids is a popular viewing location for the annual Avon Descent whitewater race.

Brigadoon is bordered by the Avon River / Swan River and Jumbuck Hill Park to the north-west and Walyunga National Park in the north. The area of Brigadoon was originally owned by the wife of Alan Bond, but is now home to the State Equestrian Centre in the south-west, and features a growing number of large plot housing estates along its eastern border with the rural town district of Gidgegannup.

References

Suburbs of Perth, Western Australia
Darling Range
Suburbs and localities in the City of Swan